Mohamed El Kettani is a Moroccan businessman and the CEO of Attijariwafa Bank. He previously worked at Wafa Assurance, and serves concurrently as a director of the Société Ivoirienne de Banque.

Education

He earned his engineering diploma from ENSTA Paris.

Career

El Kettani began his career at the Banque Commerciale du Maroc in 1984.

El Kettani is an adviser to King Mohammed VI of Morocco.

Recognition

In April 2015, he became an Officer of the Order of Legion of Honour On 22 July, 2019, El Kettani received the rank of Commander of the National Order of the Ivory Coast.

References

Moroccan businesspeople
Living people
Moroccan chief executives
Year of birth missing (living people)